The Treaty of Fulda was signed on November 2, 1813, at Fulda, Hesse, in Germany. It was signed by King Frederick I of Württemberg and Austrian foreign minister Klemens Wenzel Nepomuk Lothar von Metternich after the Battle of Leipzig. Based on the terms of the treaty, Württemberg was no longer a member of the Confederation of the Rhine.

External links
Germany in the 19th Century

1813 treaties
Fulda
Fulda
Treaties of the Kingdom of Württemberg
1813 in Germany
1813 in the Austrian Empire
November 1813 events